Irina Kikkas (born July 22, 1984 in Tallinn) is an Estonian rhythmic gymnast. She had her highest placement finishing 12th in All-around at the 2001 World Championships. She finished 16th in All-around at the 2008 European Championships. She represented Estonia at the 2008 Summer Olympics in Beijing, and competed for her nation's official debut in the rhythmic individual all-around competition. Kikkas placed twentieth in the qualifying round of the competition, with a total score of 62.775; therefore, she did not advance into the final round. Since 2009 she started her couch career by opening her own club named “Irina Kikkas Gymnastic Club”.

Education
1992 - 2000 Tallinn Õismäe general gymnasium.
2000 - 2003 Tallinn Õismäe Russian Lyceum (gold medal);
2003 - 2006 Tallinn University - Bachelor - specialty: choreography.
2006 - ... Tallinn University - Master - specialty: choreographer.

References

External links
 NBC 2008 Olympics profile
 Irina Kikkase klub

1984 births
Living people
Estonian rhythmic gymnasts
Gymnasts at the 2008 Summer Olympics
Olympic gymnasts of Estonia
Sportspeople from Tallinn
20th-century Estonian women
21st-century Estonian women